Ledson Marsh is a  freshwater marsh in Annadel State Park east of Santa Rosa in Sonoma County, California, United States.  Located on the east flank of Bennett Mountain, it drains into Schultz Creek, a tributary of Yulupa Creek.

Earthen dam
Over the years, the dam deteriorated, allowing water to seep through it and causing the marsh to dry out in the autumn and refill during the winter rains. The deterioration was partly due to rodent holes and partly due to stumps left by the felling of eucalyptus trees that were planted on both sides of the embankment.

There was concern over the dam's safety.  A catastrophic dam failure would destroy the marsh habitat and clog various Sonoma Creek tributaries with sediment.  The California Department of Parks and Recreation therefore repaired the dam in such a way as to preserve the marsh's seasonality. 

California red-legged frogs
Because of its seasonality, the marsh was colonized by California red-legged frogs (Rana draytonii), a federal- and state-listed threatened species.  Government agencies grew concerned that if the marsh did not dry out every year, bullfrogs might establish themselves in the marsh, displacing the red-legged frogs.

Recreation
The marsh is a picnicking and bird-watching spot, and also used for mountain bicyclists, hikers, joggers, and equestrians.

See also
Annadel State Park
Lake Ilsanjo

References

External links

 Sound recording of California Red-legged Frog chorus at Ledson Marsh
 Microhabitat use of the California Red-Legged Frog and introduced bullfrog in a seasonal marsh

Marshes of California
Landforms of Sonoma County, California
Wetlands of the San Francisco Bay Area